The 1997 Syracuse Orangemen football team competed in football on behalf of Syracuse University during the 1997 NCAA Division I-A football season. The Orangemen were coached by Paul Pasqualoni and played their home games at the Carrier Dome in Syracuse, New York.

Schedule
Source:

Roster

Game summaries

Wisconsin (Kickoff Classic)

NC State

at Oklahoma

at Virginia Tech

Tulane

East Carolina

at Rutgers

Temple

West Virginia

Boston College

at Pittsburgh

at Miami (FL)

Kansas State (Fiesta Bowl)

References

Syracuse
Syracuse Orange football seasons
Syracuse Orangemen football